Yves Racine (born February 7, 1969) is a Canadian former professional ice hockey defenceman who played in the National Hockey League (NHL).

Biography
As a youth, Racine played in the 1981 and 1982 Quebec International Pee-Wee Hockey Tournaments with a minor ice hockey team from Charlesbourg, Quebec City.

Racine was drafted 11th overall by the Detroit Red Wings in the 1987 NHL Entry Draft. He played 508 NHL games for the Detroit Red Wings, Montreal Canadiens, Philadelphia Flyers, San Jose Sharks, Calgary Flames and Tampa Bay Lightning, and his last season in NHL was 1997-98. 

Later, he played one season in Jokerit in Finland and five seasons in Germany, mostly in Adler Mannheim. Racine won a gold medal playing for Canada at the 1994 World Ice Hockey Championships. He retired after the 2005–2006 season, his 2nd season playing for Thetford-Mines Prolab of the LNAH.

He currently works for Arizona Capital, in Quebec City.

Career statistics

Regular season and playoffs

International

References

External links
 

1969 births
Adirondack Red Wings players
Adler Mannheim players
Calgary Flames players
Canadian ice hockey defencemen
Detroit Red Wings draft picks
Detroit Red Wings players
ERC Ingolstadt players
French Quebecers
Ice hockey people from Quebec
Jokerit players
Kentucky Thoroughblades players
Living people
Longueuil Chevaliers players
Montreal Canadiens players
National Hockey League first-round draft picks
People from Matane
Philadelphia Flyers players
Quebec Rafales players
San Jose Sharks players
Tampa Bay Lightning players
Victoriaville Tigres players
Canadian expatriate ice hockey players in Finland
Canadian expatriate ice hockey players in Germany